Stanley is a village in the Metropolitan Borough of Wakefield in West Yorkshire, England.
Stanley was an Urban District in the West Riding of Yorkshire before 1974, being made up the four electoral wards of Lake Lock, Outwood, Stanley and Wrenthorpe. The Lofthouse / Stanley area of West Yorkshire has a combined population of 22,947. The ward remaining at the 2011 Census was called Stanley and Outwood East. The population of this ward at the 2011 Census was 15,314.

Geography and amenities

Stanley's physical footprint is larger than that of its parent City Wakefield. Whilst often considered being a village, Stanley is actually an array of individual settlements such as The Grove, Stanley Ferry, Lee Moor and Lane Ends. Lane Ends is often perceived as the "village" centre

Stanley consists of the main village and neighbouring areas including Lee Moor, Lane Ends, The Grove and Stanley Ferry. Sometimes Bottom Boat is considered part of Stanley, although it is considered a separate place by the 2011 United Kingdom census.

The area has a number of commercial premises and corner-shops. It has a few pubs including The Wheatsheaf, Bar Stanley, Stanley Ferry and The Travellers and is also home to St Peters School, Stanley Grove School, Kingsland School, Stanley Surgery and a large community centre. Stanley has a couple of fish and chip shops, and a few other takeaway food outlets. There is a cafe in the village near to Stanley Marsh nature reserve.

Stanley is home to the Stanley Marsh nature reserve which is a site consisting of varied terrain including a lake. The reserve is situated on the site of a former colliery, (see Lake Lock Rail Road).

The Anglican parish church, St. Peter's, a large dominant building, was constructed in 1822 at a cost of £12,000 and opened on 6 September 1824. It was demolished in 2014 and consultations are taking place within the local community regarding the use of the land. A landscaped public garden is one option being considered.

Sports

Stanley also plays host to the Stanley Falcons, a successful cricket team who play in Division One of the Central Yorkshire Cricket League. Stanley Rangers ARLFC, an amateur rugby league team who play in National Conference League Division Two.

Stanley Rodillians RUFC Ltd is based at Manley Park on Lee Moor Road and currently play in the Yorkshire 4 league.

Following the collapse of a previous project for a new stadium in 2009, due to an objection by Leeds City Council regarding use of greenbelt land, Wakefield Trinity Wildcats will (planning permission permissive) be looking to move to a new stadium by 2015.

The golf course is built on the former grounds of the grade II listed Hatfeild Hall[sic] and the former hall buildings serve as a clubhouse and event location. The Mulberry tree in the grounds of Hatfeild Hall is rumoured to be the one from which a cutting was taken and planted inside the exercise area of Wakefield Gaol, which gave rise to the rhyme "Here We Go Round the Mulberry Bush".

See also
Listed buildings in Stanley and Outwood East

References

External links

 Stanley History Online

Suburbs of Wakefield
Unparished areas in West Yorkshire